is a horse festival in Iwate Prefecture, Japan. Held on the second Saturday in June, approximately one hundred horses with colourful fittings and bells parade between Sozen Shrine in Takizawa and Morioka Hachiman-gū. The term chagu-chagu is an onomatopoeic expression for the sound made by the horses' bells. In 1978 the festival was recorded as an Intangible Folk Cultural Property. In 1996 the sound of the bells of the Chagu Chagu Umakko was selected by the Ministry of the Environment as one of the 100 Soundscapes of Japan.

See also
 Matsuri
 List of Important Intangible Folk Cultural Properties
 100 Soundscapes of Japan

References

External links
 Chagu Chagu Umakko

Tourist attractions in Iwate Prefecture
Festivals in Japan
Horses in culture
Culture in Iwate Prefecture
Equestrian festivals